Ragheb or Raghib is a given name and surname. Notable people with the name include:

Ragheb Aga (born 1984), Kenyan cricketer
Raghib Ahsan, politician and member of the Constituent Assembly of India
Ragheb Alama (born 1962), Lebanese singer, dancer, composer, television personality, philanthropist
Raghib Allie-Brennan (born 1991), American politician and former political aide
Raghib al-Alami, the mayor of Gaza City between 1965 and 1970
Ali Abu Al-Ragheb (born 1946), the 33rd Prime Minister of Jordan
Al-Raghib al-Isfahani, eleventh-century Muslim scholar of Qur'anic exegesis and the Arabic language
Raghib al-Nashashibi (1881–1951), CBE (hon), was a wealthy landowner and public figure
Ragheb Harb (1952–1984), Lebanese leader and Muslim cleric
Raghib Ismail (born 1969), American retired player of American and Canadian football
Ragheb Moftah (1898–2001), Egyptian musicologist and scholar of the Coptic music heritage
Raghib Pasha (1819–1884), Greek Ottoman politician and Prime Minister of Egypt
Awad Ragheb (born 1982), retired Jordanian footballer of Palestinian origin
Mehrnoush Najafi Ragheb (born 1979), Iranian lawyer, Persian blogger, women's rights activist
Mohamed El-Malky Ragheb (born 1953), Egyptian wrestler
Mohamed Ragheb (born 1943), Syrian sports shooter
Khalid Raghib (born 1969), Moroccan former footballer
Ragheb Sergani, Egyptian professor of urology at Cairo University

See also
Ragıp, Turkish version of the name
Raqeeb, 2007 film

Arabic masculine given names
Arabic-language surnames
Turkish masculine given names
Turkish-language surnames
Egyptian masculine given names
Surnames of Lebanese origin
Surnames of Arabic origin
Surnames of Turkish origin
Surnames of Tunisian origin
Surnames of Greek origin